James "Jocky" Petrie is a Scottish professional chef, best known for his work alongside chef Heston Blumenthal as head of development of the Experimental Kitchen at The Fat Duck, and as Group Executive Development Chef for Gordon Ramsay. He has regularly appeared as mentor and judge on a number of television shows including MasterChef, Heston's Fantastical Food, In Search of Perfection, and Top Chef Suomi.

Petrie was a sous-chef to Gordon Ramsay on Hell's Kitchen in the show's seventeenth season and eighteenth season first broadcast in September 2017.

Biography

Early career 

Originally from Duror, a village in the Scottish Highlands, Petrie began his formative career in Scotland in the hotels of Edinburgh and Kinnaird Estate in Perthshire. He then moved south to one Michelin star Hambleton Hall before leaving the UK for Virginia in the United States, to work at two Michelin Star The Inn at Little Washington.

The Fat Duck 

In 2001, Petrie joined The Fat Duck in Bray, Berkshire where he rose to head pastry chef role, during which time the restaurant achieved a third Michelin star and was ranked 1st on the list of The World's 50 Best Restaurants. In 2009, Petrie was appointed head of development of The Fat Duck Experimental Kitchen, later that year the restaurant was given a top score of ten out of ten in The Good Food Guide. His role also included development of dishes for all of Heston's restaurants and brands, including The Hinds Head and 2 Michelin star restaurant Dinner by Heston Blumenthal in central London. Petrie resigned from his post at The Fat Duck in 2013. In 2011/12 he was included among the chefs researching for a paper 'Bittersweet Symphony' by Heston Blumenthal and Charles Spence, professor of experimental psychology at Oxford University, exploring the manipulation of bitter and sweet tastes through the use of music.

The Ledbury 

In 2014-15 he completed a specially created year-long post as head of development at two Michelin Star and award-winning London restaurant The Ledbury, winner of Best UK restaurant three years in a row and UK's best restaurant Observer Food Monthly.

Gordon Ramsay 

Petrie joined the Gordon Ramsay Group in 2015 in the specially created role of executive head of development. His role with Ramsay includes overseeing, creating and developing dishes for all of Ramsay's UK restaurants and working with Ramsay on his television shows.

Television and media 

Petrie was the blue team sous-chef to Gordon Ramsay on Hell's Kitchen seasons 17 and 18 broadcast on Fox and later on ITV in the UK.

Petrie has appeared on Heston's Fantastical Food, Big Chef Takes On Little Chef, Mission Impossible, Heston's Feasts, The One Show, and as both featured mentor and regular guest judge on BBC Masterchef and Masterchef: The Professionals. International appearances include Top Chef Suomi Finland, Hansin Matkassa, Masterchef Australia and MasterChef Greece, and as the UK representative judge at World Chocolate Masters Final.

Petrie regularly appeared as panel member on BBC Radio 4's The Kitchen Cabinet presented by Jay Rayner. He has contributed to many food publications including Ramsay in 10, In Search of Perfection, The Big Fat Duck Cookbook, Patisserie and Dessert Magazine, In The Mix and Where Chefs Eat. He has been featured in The Guardian, Observer Food Monthly and as the cover feature in Restaurant.

Personal life 

Petrie is married to Irish-born violinist and singer Una Palliser. They have two daughters

References

Scottish chefs
People from Argyll and Bute
Hell's Kitchen (American TV series)
Living people
1970 births